The 1997 Louisiana Tech Bulldogs football team was an American football team that represented Louisiana Tech University as an independent during the 1997 NCAA Division I-A football season. In their second year under head coach Gary Crowton, the team compiled an 9–2 record.

Schedule

References

Louisiana Tech Bulldogs
Louisiana Tech Bulldogs football seasons
Louisiana Tech Bulldogs football